Arthur James Michael Milner, 2nd Baron Milner of Leeds (12 September 1923 – 20 August 2003), was a British solicitor and Labour Party politician.

Biography
Milner was the only son of James Milner, 1st Baron Milner of Leeds, and was born in Leeds in 1923. He was educated in Oundle School and Trinity Hall, Cambridge, with an interruption of four years, when Milner served in the Royal Air Force as a Flight Lieutenant. He graduated with a Master of Arts in 1948, working then as solicitor in his family firm. In July 1967, he inherited his father's title.

Milner was Assistant Labour Whip from 1971 to 1974, and retired when Harold Wilson became prime minister again. After the House of Lords Act 1999, he was one of the 92 hereditary peers elected to remain in the House of Lords, a reference to his continual support for Labour and to his father. He was further a Member of the Worshipful Company of Clothworkers and Honorary Treasurer of the Society of Yorkshiremen in London between 1967 and 1970.

Marriage and children
Milner married twice. Firstly, he married Sheila Margaret Hartley on 31 March 1951. They had three children:

 Hon. Geraldine Jane Milner (born 24 November 1954)
 Hon. Meredith Ann Milner (born 28 September 1956, died 31 December 1993)
 Richard James Milner, 3rd Baron Milner of Leeds (born 16 May 1959)

After his wife's death in 2000, Milner married secondly Helen Cutting Wilmerding in 2002. Milner died in 2003 at the age of 79 and was succeeded in the barony by his only son Richard.

References

1923 births
2003 deaths
Alumni of Trinity Hall, Cambridge
2
Labour Party (UK) hereditary peers
British solicitors

Hereditary peers elected under the House of Lords Act 1999